Kevin Mulgrew is a former association football player who represented New Zealand at international level.

Mulgrew made his full All Whites debut in a 2–1 win over China on 20 July 1975 and ended his international playing career with 12 A-international caps and 1 goal to his credit, his final cap a substitute appearance in a 1–2 loss to New Caledonia on 2 October 1976.

References 

Year of birth missing (living people)
Living people
New Zealand association footballers
New Zealand international footballers

Association footballers not categorized by position